The 13th Central Inspection Commission (CIC) of the Communist Party of Vietnam (CPV), formally the 13th Central Inspection Commission of the Central Committee of the Communist Party of Vietnam (Vietnamese: Ủy ban Kiểm tra Trung ương Đảng Cộng sản Việt Nam khóa XIII), was elected by the 1st Plenary Session of the 13th Central Committee in the immediate aftermath of the 13th National Congress. Trần Cẩm Tú was re-elected for a second term as Chairman of the CIC, a position he has held since 2018.

Officers

Members

References

Bibliography

13th Central Inspection Commission of the Communist Party of Vietnam